Bagvalal may be,

Bagvalal people
Bagvalal language